David Yair Hazony (born 1969) is an American-born Israeli writer, translator, and editor. He was the founding editor of The Tower Magazine from 2013 to 2017, and from 2017-2020 served as executive director of the Israel Innovation Fund. He currently is an independent editor with Wicked Son Books.

Career
Hazony studied at Columbia University, received a B.A. and M.A. from Yeshiva University, and completed his Ph.D. at the Hebrew University of Jerusalem.

Hazony has written for the New Republic, CNN.com, The Forward, Commentary, Moment, The Jerusalem Post, the Jewish Chronicle, the New York Sun, Jewish Ideas Daily, and has appeared on CNN, MSNBC, and Fox News.

He was a fellow at the Shalem Center in Jerusalem, founded by his older brother Yoram Hazony, until 2007. In 2004–2007, he served as editor in chief of Azure, its quarterly.

From 2013 to 2017, he served as founding editor of The Tower Magazine, an online publication about Israel and the Middle East published by the Washington, D.C.-based Israel Project.

Notable publications
Books:
 Author of The Ten Commandments: How Our Most Ancient Moral Text Can Renew Modern Life (Scribner, September 2010), a finalist for the 2010 National Jewish Book Award.
 Edited Eliezer Berkovits, Essential Essays on Judaism (Shalem Press, 2002); Eliezer Berkovits, God, Man, and History (Shalem Press, 2004); and (together with Michael B. Oren and Yoram Hazony, eds.), New Essays on Zionism (Shalem Press, 2007).
 Translated Emuna Elon's novel If You Awaken Love (Toby, 2007), a finalist for the 2007 National Jewish Book Award.
 Translated Uri Bar-Joseph, "The Angel" (HarperCollins, 2016), winner of the 2017 National Jewish Book Award.
Essays:
 "Israeli Identity and the Future of American Jewry" The Tower Magazine, June–July 2017.
 "The Mind of the President," The Tower Magazine, June 2016.
 "Zionism and the Changing Global Structure" (with Adam Scott Bellos), The Jerusalem Post, December 12, 2017.
 "Aliyah of the Mind" (with Adam Scott Bellos), The Jerusalem Post, September 3, 2019.
 "How Israel Is Solving the Global Water Crisis'" The Tower Magazine, October 2015.

References

External links
 Official website

Living people
American emigrants to Israel
Israeli Jews
Israeli editors
Yeshiva University alumni
Hebrew University of Jerusalem alumni
Israeli journalists
1969 births
Jewish American writers
21st-century American Jews